The Luxury of Time is the debut album by singer-songwriter David Mead, released by RCA Records in 1999. "Mead writes slick, sophisticated, and at its best, timeless sounding pop songs that seem to be rooted as much in the tradition of Gershwin and Porter as they are in the music of Lennon and McCartney or Elvis Costello," wrote Brett Hartenbach for AllMusic. "Though sporting a somewhat glossier sound, The Luxury of Time fits nicely alongside the works of such artists as Freedy Johnston and Ron Sexsmith as the touchstone for the '90s new crop of young writers."

Track listing
All tracks written by David Mead.

 "Robert Bradley's Postcard" – 4:23
 "Sweet Sunshine" – 4:20
 "Touch of Mascara" – 3:37
 "Apart From You" – 3:13
 "Breathe You In" – 4:20
 "World of a King" – 3:48
 "Landlocked" – 4:47
 "Telephone" – 3:56
 "Everyone Knows It But You" – 4:00
 "She, Luisa" – 3:34
 "Make the Most Of" – 4:16
 "While the World Is Sleeping" – 4:06
 "Painless" – 3:30

Session outtakes
"Bucket of Girls" (rerecorded for Indiana)
"Claws" 
"Jonathan Barnum, Talk of the Town"

Personnel 
Rusty Anderson – guitars (12-string, acoustic, electric), bouzouki, screams
Kenny Aronoff, Paul Deakin, Marc Pisapia – drums
Richard Foust – trombone
Paul David Hager – tambourine
Michael Hanna – string arrangements
Havana Horns – horns
David Henry – cello
Carl Herrgesell – mellotron, Wurlitzer organ
Jim Horn – saxophone
Scotty Huff, Matt Nygren – trumpet
Viktor Krauss – upright bass
Peter Langella, Craig Young – bass
Mike Lawler – Hammond organ
Jason Lehning – Hammond organ, Vox Continental organ, Wurlitzer organ, Omnichord, harmonium, lap steel guitar
Tom McGinley – baritone saxophone
Chris McHugh – drums, percussion
David Mead – vocals, acoustic and electric guitars, piano, thumb piano, keyboards, percussion
Joe Pisapia – guitar
Anthony J. Resta – percussion, synthesizer programming
Kayton Roberts – lap steel guitar
Paul Zonn – clarinet

Production notes
Recorded by Roger Moutenot, Jason Lehning, and Paul David Hager; mixed by Hager and Mike Shipley; and mastered by Ted Jensen. Photography by Tony Duran and art direction by Sean Mosher-Smith.

References

David Mead (musician) albums
Albums with cover art by Tony Duran
1999 debut albums